Johnston Station may refer to:

Johnston railway station, Johnston, Pembrokeshire, Wales
Original name of Ludowici, Georgia, United States